Jonathan Figy (born 25 August 2001) is a cricketer who plays for the United Arab Emirates national cricket team. In December 2019, he was named in the One Day International (ODI) squad for the 2019 United Arab Emirates Tri-Nation Series. He made his ODI debut for the UAE, against Scotland on 15 December 2019, and was one of three university students in the UAE's team. Later the same month, he was named in the UAE's squad for the 2020 Under-19 Cricket World Cup. In the UAE's first match of the tournament, against Canada, he scored an unbeaten 102 runs. It was the first century by a batsman for the United Arab Emirates in a U19 Cricket World Cup match. He was the leading run-scorer for the UAE in the tournament, with 197 runs in six matches.

Figy was born in Dubai to Indian parents. He attended Abu Dhabi Indian School, then in 2017 moved to England to attend Winchester College on a cricket scholarship, where he led the school team in runs in both seasons he played. He matriculated to Leeds University in 2019.

References

External links
 

2001 births
Living people
Emirati cricketers
United Arab Emirates One Day International cricketers
Sportspeople from Dubai
People educated at Winchester College
Indian expatriate sportspeople in the United Arab Emirates